Never Love A Stranger is a 1958 crime and gangster film that is based on Harold Robbins' 1948 debut novel with the same title. The film was shot in black and white starring John Drew Barrymore and Robert Bray, and featuring a young Steve McQueen.

Plot
Frankie Kane (Barrymore) is brought up in a Catholic orphanage. He befriends a Jewish law student named Martin Cabell (McQueen) and becomes romantically involved with Cabell's maid, Julie (Lita Milan). Kane learns later that he is also Jewish, and when told he will be removed from the orphanage and moved to a Jewish home he runs away and turns to a life of crime. Later, after joining a major crime syndicate, he reconnects with Julie, finally deciding to join Martin, now a district attorney, in shutting down the syndicate.

Main cast
 John Drew Barrymore as Frankie Kane
 Lita Milan as Julie, maid to the Cabell Family
 Steve McQueen as Martin Cabell
 Robert Bray as "Silk" Fennelli
 Salem Ludwig as Moishe Moscowitz
 R. G. Armstrong as Flix
 Douglas Rodgers as Brother Bernard
 Felice Orlandi as Bert
 Augusta Merighi as Mrs. Cozzolina
 Abe Simon as "Fats" Crown
 Vitina Marcus as Frances Kane

Original novel
Robbins' novel was published in 1948. It became a best seller.

The book was one of a number banned in Philadelphia as indecent. The ban was overturned the following year.

Production
In August 1957 it was announced that Barrymore would star and Robbins would write and produce. The Los Angeles Times called the part "the usual Barrymore role". At the time, Barrymore was under a year's suspension from Actors Equity, but this seemed to apply only to stage work.

The film was made through Caryn Productions, Robbins' own production company. Richard Day became co-producer and Allied Artists agreed to release. Filming started in the Bronx on 9 September.

Robert Stevens agreed to direct and Steve McQueen was given an early role.

References

External links

1958 films
Film noir
American gangster films
Allied Artists films
Films directed by Robert Stevens
1958 crime drama films
American crime drama films
Films based on American novels
1950s English-language films
1950s American films